The Sofia University "St. Kliment Ohridski" Museum of Paleontology and Historical Geology (SUMPHG), is a paleontology museum located in the main building of Sofia University “St. Kliment Ohridski", Sofia, Bulgaria.

History 

The museum is within the main building of Sofia University, designed by Jean Bréasson, re-designed by Yordan Milanov, and later by Ljuben Konstantinov.  Its collections are primarily intended for research and are, thus, not accessible to the public. A limited number of fossils from the collection is on display in the SUMPHG, and is one of the primary localities for storing fossils collected in Bulgaria. The original fossils, around which the current collection has grown, were those gathered by the first Bulgarian state geologist Georgi Zlatarski (1854 - 1909) and those purchased from Dr. A. Krantz.  Later specimens collected by doctoral students and as part of the Bulgarian geological surveys were added.

Faculty

Many notable Bulgarian paleontologists had worked at SUMPHG, including Peter Bakalov, Vassil Tzankov, Ivan Nikolov, Natalia Dimitrova, Milka Entcheva, Emilia Kojumdjieva, Nonka Motekova, Stoycho Breskovski, Angel Pamouktchiev, etc.

Public access 

Admission is free to the museum for all visitors. The museum is open 10 am - 12 am, 1 pm - 4 pm Monday to Friday.  It is closed on Saturdays and Sundays.  SUMPHG is an important venue for widening interest in paleontology, evolutionary biology and Earth sciences.

The museum logo is based on the Deinotherium skeleton displayed by the entrance.

References

Exhibits of geologic eras and periods

External links

See also

 
 National Museum of Natural History, Bulgaria

Museums established in 1897
Paleontology websites
University museums
Natural history museums in Bulgaria
Geology museums
Museums in Bulgaria
Paleontology in Bulgaria
Evolutionary biology
Fossil museums
Historical geology
Museums in Sofia
Geology museums in Bulgaria